Kasha Kelley (October 5, 1969) was a Republican member of the Kansas House of Representatives, representing the 80th district.  She had served since 2005. She lost her primary in 2016. The American Conservative Union gave her a 91% evaluation. Kelley, who received her BS in Broadcast Journalism from the University of Kansas, is CEO of the Customer Retention Company and of First Intermark Corporation.

Committee membership
 Taxation
 Energy and Environment
 Education

References

External links
 Official Website
 
 Project Vote Smart profile
 Kansas Votes profile

Republican Party members of the Kansas House of Representatives
Living people
University of Kansas alumni
Women state legislators in Kansas
21st-century American politicians
21st-century American women politicians
Conservatism in the United States
1969 births